The 2021 Città di Forlì II was a professional tennis tournament played on hard courts. It was the first edition of the tournament which was part of the 2021 ATP Challenger Tour. It took place in Forlì, Italy between 29 November and 5 December 2021.

Singles main-draw entrants

Seeds

 1 Rankings as of 22 November 2021.

Other entrants
The following players received wildcards into the singles main draw:
  Francesco Forti
  Matteo Gigante
  Luca Nardi

The following players received entry into the singles main draw using protected rankings:
  Julian Lenz
  Yannick Maden

The following player received entry into the singles main draw as a special exempt:
  Evgeny Karlovskiy

The following players received entry into the singles main draw as alternates:
  Raúl Brancaccio
  Lucas Miedler

The following players received entry from the qualifying draw:
  Jonáš Forejtek
  Jelle Sels
  Aldin Šetkić
  Alexey Vatutin

Champions

Singles

 Maxime Cressy def.  Matthias Bachinger 6–4, 6–2.

Doubles

 Antonio Šančić /  Tristan-Samuel Weissborn def.  Lukáš Rosol /  Vitaliy Sachko 7–6(7–4), 4–6, [10–7].

References

Città di Forlì II
Città di Forlì II
November 2021 sports events in Italy
December 2021 sports events in Italy